MB3 is a dwarf spheroidal galaxy discovered in 1997 and located about 10 million light-years away from the Earth. It was discovered during an optical survey of the IC 342/Maffei group to which the galaxy is a member. MB3 is a companion galaxy of Dwingeloo 1 and situated in the Zone of Avoidance. MB 3 is thought to be a member of the IC 342/Maffei Group, a galaxy group adjacent to the Local Group.

The visible diameter of MB 3 is approximately 1.9′, which at the distance of 3 Mpc corresponds to about 2 kpc. In optical images it appears as a highly flattened diffuse oval located approximately 9.2′ to the southwest of Dwingeloo 1. No neutral or molecular hydrogen has been detected in it, which is consistent with its classification as a dwarf spheroidal galaxy.

References

External links
Dwingeloo 2 – Galaxy

Dwarf galaxies
IC 342/Maffei Group
Astronomical objects discovered in 1997
166069
Cassiopeia (constellation)